The Revolutionary Army is a revolutionary pamphlet that was written by Zou Rong and published in Shanghai in 1903 with a preface by Zhang Binglin. It propagates the justice and necessity of the revolution and exposes the decadence and reaction of the Manchu rule. Zou attacks the Manchus as an evil race, and calls on the Han race to replace them. The aim of the book was to dethrone the Manchu government and set up a Republic of China by revolutionary means.

In 1902, Zou Rong went to Japan to study, influenced by Sun Yat-sen's revolutionary ideas, and devoted himself to the democratic revolutionary struggle. During his stay in Japan, Zou wrote a book of more than 20,000 words entitled The Revolutionary Army, in which he systematically elaborated on the object, nature, tasks and future of the democratic revolution.

From 1903, The Revolutionary Army was reprinted in 29 editions in Shanghai, Singapore, Japan, Hong Kong and the United States, with more than 1 million copies distributed, accounting for the first place in the sales of revolutionary books during the late Qing dynasty.

The Revolutionary Army was the first work in Modern Chinese history that systematically and clearly propagated democratic ideas, republican revolution and called for the creation of a democratic republic, and played a catalytic role in the Chinese democratic revolution. Zhang Shizhao praised the book as "the first textbook for the national people today".

John Lust's The Revolutionary Army. A Chinese Nationalist Tract of 1903 (The Hague: Mouton; Matériaux Pour L'étude De L'extrême-Orient Moderne Et Contemporain. Textes ; 6, 1968) offers the Chinese text, English translation, an extensive Introduction, and detailed notes.

References

1903 non-fiction books
Political books
Pamphlets